Sinatra, With Love is a 2014 compilation album by Frank Sinatra, consisting of 16 romance songs from Capitol Records and Reprise Records.

Track listing
"Moonlight Becomes You" (Johnny Burke, Jimmy Van Heusen) – 2:46
"Love is Here to Stay" (George Gershwin, Ira Gershwin) - 2:42
"Just One of Those Things" (Cole Porter) – 3:14
"Misty" (Erroll Garner, Burke) – 2:41
"Nice 'n' Easy" (Alan Bergman, Marilyn Keith, Lew Spence) – 2:45
"It Could Happen to You" (Burke, Van Heusen) – 3:16
"The Way You Look Tonight" (Jerome Kern, Dorothy Fields) - 3:22
"Love Looks So Well On You" (Spence, Keith, Bergman) - 2:41
"(Love Is) The Tender Trap" (Sammy Cahn, Van Heusen) – 3:00
"I Love You" (Porter)  – 2:16
"The Look of Love" (Cahn, Van Heusen) – 2:43
"Something's Gotta Give" (Johnny Mercer) – 2:38
"From This Moment On" (Porter) - 3:50
"Wave" (Antonio Carlos Jobim) – 3:25
"It Had to Be You" (Isham Jones, Gus Kahn) - 3:53
"My Foolish Heart" (Ned Washington, Victor Young) - 2:47

Frank Sinatra compilation albums
Compilation albums published posthumously